The Chaga or Chagga (Swahili language: Wachaga) are Bantu-speaking indigenous Africans and the third-largest ethnic group in Tanzania. They traditionally live on the slopes of Mount Kilimanjaro and eastern Mount Meru in both Kilimanjaro Region and eastern Arusha Region. Their relative economic wealth comes from favorable fertile soil of mount Kilimanjaro and successful agricultural methods, which include extensive irrigation systems, terracing, and continuous organic fertilization methods practiced for thousands of years.

The Chaga are said to have descended from various Bantu groups who migrated from elsewhere in Africa to the foothills of Mount Kilimanjaro, a migration that began around the start of the eleventh century. While the Chaga are Bantu-speakers, their language has a number of dialects somewhat related to Kamba, which is spoken in southeast Kenya,. They are ethnically related to the Pare, Taveta, Shambaa people and Taita peoples. The inhabitants reveal migration occurred back and forth throughout the history of these groups, and the Chaga people should be viewed as a part of the bigger population inhabiting the entire Kilimanjaro Corridor.

The Chagaland is traditionally divided into a number of small kingdoms known as Umangi. They follow a patrilineal system of descent and inheritance. Their traditional way of life was based primarily on agriculture, using irrigation on terraced fields and oxen manure. Although bananas are their staple food, they also cultivate various crops, including yams, beans, and maize. In agricultural exports, they are best known for their Arabica coffee, which is exported to the global market, resulting in coffee being a primary cash crop.

Early history

Identification and location

By 1899 the Kichagga-speaking people on Mount Kilimanjaro were divided into 37 autonomous kingdoms called "Umangi' in Chaga languages. Early accounts frequently identify the inhabitants of each kingdom as a separate "tribe." Although the Chaga are principally located on Mount Kilimanjaro in northern Tanzania, numerous families have migrated elsewhere over the course of the twentieth century. In 1946 the British administration had greatly reduced the number of kingdoms due to large scale reorganization and creation of newly settled land on the lower slopes on the western and eastern slopes of Kilimanjaro.

Around the beginning of the twentieth century, the German colonial government estimated that there were about 28,000 households on Kilimanjaro. In 1988, the Chaga population was estimated at over 800,000 individuals.

Cultural relations

Bantu peoples came to Kilimanjaro in a succession of migrations that started at least five or six hundred years ago. It is likely that there were other peoples on the mountain for hundreds of years before they arrived. Historical accounts of the Chaga written by Europeans date from the nineteenth century. The first European to reach the mountain was a missionary, Johannes Rebmann, who arrived there in 1848. At that time, Rebmann found that Kilimanjaro was so actively involved in far-reaching trading connections that a chief whose court he visited had a coastal Swahili resident in his entourage. Chaga chiefdoms traded with each other, with the peoples of the regions immediately surrounding the mountain (such as the Kamba, the Maasai, and the Pare), and also with coastal caravans. Some of this trading was hand to hand, some of it at markets, which were a general feature of the area. Many chiefdoms had several produce markets largely run by women, just as they are today.

As far back into local history as the accounts go, Chaga chiefdoms were chronically at war with one another and with nearby peoples. Various alliances and consolidations were achieved through conquest, others through diplomacy, but the resulting political units were not always durable. Alignments changed and were reorganized with the ebb and flow of the fortunes of war and trade. Presumably, the fighting between the chiefdoms was over control of trade routes, over monopolies on the provisioning of caravans, over ivory, slaves, cattle, iron, and other booty of war, and over the right to exact tribute. Outlines of the process are known from the eighteenth century onward. As large as some of the blocs of allies became, at no time in the precolonial period did any one chiefdom rule all the others. That unitary consolidation was not achieved until the German colonial government imposed it.

Initially (i.e., before the German conquest), various Chaga chiefdoms welcomed missionaries, travelers, and foreign representatives as they did traders; in the 1880s, however, when the Chaga gradually lost their autonomy, they became more defensive. In 1886 Germany and Britain divided their spheres of influence in East Africa; Kilimanjaro was allocated to the Germans. Some Chaga chiefs became German allies and helped the Germans to defeat old rivals in other Chaga chiefdoms. Sudanese and Zulu troops were also brought in when some strong chiefly resistance to German control manifested itself. By the 1890s, all the Chaga had been subjugated.

Chaga society experienced a radical change. Taxes in cash were imposed to force Africans to work for Europeans from whom they could receive wages. A native system of corvée was expanded for the benefit of the colonial government. A handful of armed Germans successfully ruled a hundred thousand Chaga by controlling them through their chiefs. The chiefs who cooperated were rewarded with more power than they had ever known. The resisting chiefs were deposed or hanged, and more malleable substitutes were appointed in their stead.

Warfare came to an end and, with it, Chaga military organization, which had been a system of male age grades. Christianity spread, and, eventually, most Chaga became, at least nominally, Christians. The churches, Catholic and Lutheran, were allocated religious control over different parts of Kilimanjaro. As part of their mission, they introduced schools and coffee-growing clinics. These developments parallel the major political reorganization effectuated by colonization and the fundamental change in the local economy. Long-distance trade became a European monopoly. Coffee growing spread rapidly over the mountain.

This general economic transformation was well under way when the colonial government passed from German hands into those of the British in 1916. Arabica coffee remains a major cash crop produced locally. Since 1961, Tanzania has been an independent nation and, among other products, relies on coffee exportation for foreign exchange.

Settlements

There are no nucleated villages on Kilimanjaro. Each household lives in the midst of its own banana-coffee garden, and the gardens, one next to another, stretch all over the lower slopes of the mountain. The gardens are, for the most part, ringed with living fences that mark their boundaries. In the older areas of settlement, male kin tend to own and reside in contiguous homestead gardens, forming localized patrilineal clusters. Because of the enormous expansion of the population and the consequent land shortage, there are no large expanses of uncultivated or unoccupied land in the banana belt. It was otherwise in earlier times. Photographs and accounts from earlier in the twentieth century show that there were open fields between the localized clusters. Such residential arrangements were not static. A household, or several together, could break away from the localized patrilineage of which they had been members. There being no land shortage, they could, with the consent of the local chief or district head in the new location, establish themselves elsewhere and even found a new patrilineal cluster. As available land became more scarce, many households moved down mountain, and some moved up, pushing back the boundary of the forest. Thus, there are older and newer settlements on the mountain, older and newer patrilineal clusters, and substantial areas where the majority of residents are from unrelated households. Gradually, as the open land has filled up, the mobility of households has been increasingly restricted.

Early migration patterns of the Niger–Congo Bantus led the Chaga to settle in the north Pare Mountains. This is the home of the ancestral Chaga. Their population growth by about the eleventh or twelfth century led a number of people to begin looking for new lands. They found it on the nearby and, in those days, still heavily forested southern and eastern slopes of Mount Kilimanjaro.

The movement of the early Chaga banana farmers to Kilimanjaro set off a period of rapid and extensive cultural amalgamation, in which large numbers of the Ongamo people and the Rift Southern Cushites were assimilated into the newly expanding Chaga communities.  Even though the Maasai settled in the open plains around much of the Chaga country, they cannot be credited with great influence on Chaga affairs during this period. Another people, the Ongamo or Ngasa who were closely related in language to the Maasai, did have much influence on Chaga history.

Although growing in numbers and territory, the Chaga in the seventeenth and eighteenth centuries remained organised into many very small and local social and political units.

Interactions with other ethnic groups

The Chaga have unique traditions compared with other tribes found in Tanzania.

Influences of other peoples

The Chaga's success in farming the highlands ensured that new communities spoke the Chaga language. These communities initially took the form of villages built along highland ridges. This custom apparently preserved an old practice coming from the Kaskazi and Upland Bantu side of their ancestry.

The Chaga also circumcised boys and initiated them into age-sets of the typical old Bantu type. At the same time, they adopted from the Southern Cushitic side of their ancestry the practice of female clitoridectomy, which they stopped after adopting Christianity or Islam.

Interactions with the Ongamo

The beginnings of Chaga interactions with the Nilotic Ongamo date well before 1600, and at some point the Ongamo had been the dominant people through much of the Mount Kilimanjaro area.

The Ongamo had a large effect on Chaga culture. They borrowed several practices from them, including female circumcision, the drinking of cattle blood, and age sets. By the second half of the nineteenth century, the Ongamo were increasingly acculturated into the Chaga. The Chaga god "Ruwa" resulted from the combination of the Chaga's concept of a creator god with the Ongamo's concept of the life giving sun.

Interactions with the Pare and foreigners

The Pare, Taveta, and Taita peoples had been the chief suppliers of iron to the Chaga. The demand for iron increased from the beginning of the nineteenth century because of military rivalries among the Chaga rulers. It is likely that there was a connection between this rivalry and the development of long-distance trade from the coast to the interior of the Pangani River basin, suggesting the Chaga's contacts with the coast may have dated to about the end of the eighteenth century. Raids and counter raids characterised the Chaga rivalry, as observed and understood by European colonisers.

Early religion 

Before the arrival of Christianity, the Chaga practiced a diverse range of faith with a thoroughgoing syncretism. The importance of ancestors is strongly maintained by them to this day. The name of the chief Chaga deity is Ruwa who resides on the top of Mount Kilimanjaro, which is sacred to them. Parts of the high forest contain old shrines with masale plantings, the sacred Chaga plant.

Kingdoms

Chaga Kingdoms appear to have been very specific with no influence from early ancestors, according to western observations done in the nineteenth century. In the nearby north Pare Mountains area of Ugweno, the kingdom system appears similar. However, in the south Pare Mountains, the old clan kingdoms of the Mashariki continued to be the ritual center of life among the early Asu and remained so, in fact, down through the nineteenth century. But among the ancestral Chaga of north Pare and among their descendants who settled around Mount Kilimanjaro, a new kind of kingship, Mangi, probably originally meaning "the arranger, planner" came into being not much before 1000 AD.

Economics, politics and Mangi rule

The Chagas are arguably one of the most economically successful people in East Africa. Like many societies in Africa, the Chaga women take the forefront positions of the Chaga society; from economical issues, to education. Chaga women stimulate a large part of the economical progressions in northern Tanzania.
The Mangi were great kings that governed largely clan-based states and controlled Chaga affairs even during colonial times. Although Mangis are not as prevalent at the present, the term 'Mangi' still rules and stands as the most respectable identity to most young and adult Chaga men.

Mangi Meli

Mangi (King) Meli (or Mangi Meli Kiusa bin Rindi Makindara) (died in 1900) was a leader of the Chaga in the late 1890s. He was hanged by the German colonial government in March 1900. Meli is one of the heroes of the former Tanganyika colony, having been prominent in the fight against colonial encroachment on the slopes of Mount Kilimanjaro.  After his capture, Meli was convicted of rebellion and was hanged at a public execution as his people watched. Following his death, the German colonial administration ordered his head to be removed and it is believed to have been sent to Berlin to be used in phrenological studies. It was then apparently stored in a museum.

Mangi Meli fought two wars against the Germans. In the first war-June 1892 fighting for 2 days he defeated them murdering a German governor and military leader in Kilimanjaro Von Burlow and expelled them completely from Kilimanjaro, but they returned a year later in August 1893 with mercenary Nubian soldiers from Sudan and other Zulu soldiers from South Africa with more advanced machine guns and fought him the second war which also took two days and defeated him. He then retreated and seek peace with the Germans where they imposed some terms and conditions. He was fined to provide labour and materials to build a new German army station at Old Moshi which he did. In 1900 the plot was revealed that he was again conspired with other Chagga, Maasai and Meru leaders to bring the biggest war to the Germans and expel them from Kilimanjaro once and for all, before that plan materialized he was captured jailed and after a trial he was found guilty and hanged outside the Germans boma on top of a deep ravine to Msangachi river at his residence Old Moshi, Tsudunyi village together with his 19 followers who were fellow leaders from many territories in Kilimanjaro and Arusha. The Germans cut and took his head to with them.

For more than a century, efforts have been made to try recover his skull and return it for proper burial in Tanzania.

Mangi Shangali (from Mushi Clan)

Machame is an area on the south-western slope of Kilimanjaro in Tanzania. Historically, it was in 1889 referred by Hans Meyer as a great African giant, also the largest and most populous of all the Chagga states in Kilimanjaro, whose ruler (Mushi Dynasty and later Shangali) as early as 1849 was reckoned as a giant African king with influence extending throughout all Chagga states except Rombo. By the 1860s, a German explorer Von der Decken (popularly known to the Chagga as Baroni), presented Machame as a confederation of western Chagga states comprising Narumu, Kindi, Kombo, to as far as the Western end of Kibongoto, each with their own chiefs under the king of Machame. Traditionally, the rulers have come from the Mushi clan (including the famous Shangali who is a descendant of Mushi) and some clans within Mushi to date are still referred to as WaMangi (Chiefs).

Mangi Sina and Mangi Rindi

The Mangi Sina and the Mangi Rindi had by the end of the nineteenth century developed large armies. When the Germans arrived in the 1880s and imposed colonial rule, they sided with Rindi to defeat Sina. Rindi had already negotiated and signed a treaty with the Germans in 1885, resulting in Moshi becoming their colonial capital.

Mangi Mkuu

In 1952, the Chaga held an election to elect Mangi Mkuu, the "Paramount Chief", to look after their affairs and speak with colonial administrators on their behalf. Thomas Marealle of Marangu won the election, defeating divisional chiefs M. H. Abdiel Shangali of Hai and John Ndaskoi Maruma of Rombo. Another divisional chief, Petro Itosi Marealle of Vunjo, withdrew from consideration before the election. 

Marealle consolidated power from the other three divisional chieftains, thus making the Chaga more powerful and in control of their own affairs. His capital was in Marangu. But Marealle's downfall occurred during Tanganyika's struggle for independence, for two main reasons:

First, He lost support among western educated people. When Chaga students at Makerere University criticized him in their college magazine, he publicly humbled them when they came home, in an "old" tribal way. He placed his faith in Petro Njau, the elderly astute party organizer who had put him in. From 1958 Njau set himself the task of enlisting the support of the old conservatives and the clan elders. This was a spurious return to the great tribal past. But Mangi Mkuu believed and trusted implicitly in him, and in the exaggerated accounts of popularity which Njau reported.
Second, Mangi Mkuu crossed swords with T.A.N.U on his home ground of Kilimanjaro. He still supported the national aims of T.A.N.U for Tanganyika. He continued to support Julius Nyerere personally, as the national leader long after he had begun to deal summarily with local T.A.N.U critics at home, perhaps because these critics did not need to be taken seriously, since they were insignificantly unrepresentative of the people. In 1957-58 the British Administration were belatedly trying to organize a council of Chiefs in Tanganyika as a delaying action against T.A.N.U, Mangi Mkuu wrote the governor asking that Nyerere himself should be invited to address the chiefs. The request was refused. It was not until 1959, when he was fighting for his political life, that Mangi Mkuu cut across Nyerere personally and cut across the national movement as such. In , by which time he was sharply on the defensive at home, Mangi Mkuu criticized Nyerere's visit to Moshi to hold an open-air TANU meeting in the town. A few months later he circularized the chiefs on the mountain, threatening to sack them if they supported TANU. 

In the local field of Chaga politics, however the break came earlier. It did not come from TANU branches as such which, though they had started in 1955 on the mountain, had made little headway among the people. It came from Machame, from the chiefly rival whom Mangi Mkuu had supplanted in 1951. Chief Abdieli Shangali threw the weight of his authority behind his son-in-law, Solomon Eliufoo, and this was the decisive factor. Eliufoo, a commoner from one of the oldest clans in Machame, and a Lutheran-trained teacher, was abroad in the United States and Great Britain from 1953 to 1956. In 1957, he returned as a teacher and joined the TANU branch in Machame. In 1958, he entered politics; he became a nominated member of the Chagga Council, being nominated by Hai divisional council of which his father-in-law, Chief Abdieli Shangali, was chairman. The same year, he was elected member of the legislative council in Dar es Salaam on the TANU ticket. From 1958 onwards, he was engaged in central politics becoming minister of health from 1959 to 1960, and in 1962 minister of education, a post which he held up to 1967. At the local level, he organised and led opposition to the Mangi Mkuu and by 1959 he called for the resignation or abdication of the Mangi Mkuu and the democratization for the local governments, forming a new party called the Chaga Democratic Party.

Towards the end of 1959, the opposition of the Chaga Democratic party forced a deadlock in the Chagga Council. A vote was taken in the council as to whether a referendum should be held on Kilimanjaro to decide whether the Chaga wanted a Paramount Chief for life or a periodically elected president. The vote was carried by a narrow majority, and the Mangi Mkuu was abolished. After independence, through Nyerere's socialism and integration policies, the rule of chiefs, was diminished.

Daily life and culture 

Because fish are absent from most of the streams of the Kilimanjaro foothills, fish were not traditionally consumed and were seen as having the same nature as serpents, which were considered unfriendly in Chaga culture. The Chaga people bred fowl in large numbers, to sell to the passing caravans of traders from the east coast. The Chaga, like many east African communities, value oxen, goats, and sheep. Dogs are used to help guard compounds from intruders at night. The prized cattle is the humped Zebu breed prevalent throughout east Africa since the days of Ancient Egyptians. Goats are small and handsome with small horns. Milk is an essential part of Chaga diet. Among the Chaga, the plants grown for food are maize, sweet potatoes, yams, alliums, beans, peas, red millet and bananas.

Traditional foods

Chaga people have their traditional food according to food crops they grow in their region. Most of food among Chaga people are made by banana; an example is machalari, which is most favorite food among Chaga. Machalari is prepared with banana and meat, while other traditional food includes kiburu (Banana and Beans), Kitawa (Banana and sour milk, porridge-like), mtori (Meat with banana, like porridge, mainly food for a few days after birth), mlaso, ngararimo, kisusio (soup with Blood), kimamtine and others of the like, according to nature of crops and animals on the Chaga land.

Cultural heritage

Traditional Chaga instruments include wooden flutes, bells, and drums. Dancing and singing are part of almost every celebration. Classical Chagan music is still heard in festivities; however, Chagan youth have also embraced Kiswahili songs produced by various Tanzanian bands and west and central African music and dance forms. Reggae, pop, and rap are popular with the youth. Many musicians of Chaga origin are known around Africa.

The first Chaga historian was Nathaniel Mtui, who was born in 1892 and wrote nine books about the history of the Chaga from 1913 to 1916.

Folklore 

Chaga legends centre on Ruwa and his power and assistance. 'Ruwa' is the Chaga name for their god in Eastern and Central Kilimanjaro, while in the Western region, especially Machame and Masama, the deity was referred to as 'Iruva.' Both names are also Chaga words for "sun." Ruwa is not looked upon as the creator of humankind, but rather as a liberator and provider of sustenance. He is known for his mercy and tolerance when sought by his people.

In the past, chiefdoms had chiefs who rose to power through war and trading. Some famous past chiefs include Orombo from Kishigonyi, Sina of Kibosho, and Marealle of Marangu.

Employment

Traditionally, Chaga work has been centered on the farm and is divided by gender. Men's work includes feeding goats, building and maintaining canals, preparing fields, slaughtering animals, and building houses. Women's work includes firewood and water collection, fodder cutting, cooking, and cleaning the homestead and stalls. Women are also in charge of trading in the marketplace.

Many young Chaga work as clerks, teachers, and administrators, and many engage in small-scale business activities. Women in rural areas are also generating income through activities such as crafts and tailoring. The Chaga are known for their sense of enterprise and strong work ethic.

Cuisine

The staple food of the Chaga people is bananas. Bananas are also used to make beer, their main beverage. The Chaga plant a variety of food crops, including bananas, millet, maize (corn), beans, and cassava. They also keep cattle, goats, and sheep. Due to limited land holdings and grazing areas, most Chaga people today purchase meat from butcher shops.

Modern history

They once lived under the rule of the Mangi Mkuu, even though they are not as organised as they used to be, and the Mangi is not involved in the day-to-day activities and life of the modern Chaga. The Mangis are still respected by the Chaga. Some communities such as Mushi clan in Machame still exercise their "right" to rule often referring to themselves as Watu wa kwa Mangi (people from the Chieftainship). The Chaga are now modern wage earners in large modernised cities or abroad and entrepreneurs in the tourism industry around Kilimanjaro and Arusha areas.

The Chaga still hold onto some of their traditions, like the "kihamba", which is a family plot of land usually passed down from one generation to another.

Coffee is the primary cash crop for many Chaga people after its introduction to the area in the late nineteenth century, although bananas and maize are also staples. The Chaga are also famous for a traditional brew known as mbege. It is made from a special variety of bananas and millet.

Notable people of Chaga heritage

Politicians

 Lucy Lameck - Tanganyika African National Union
 Asanterabi Zephaniah Nsilo Swai - Tanganyika African National Union
 Edwin Mtei – CHADEMA Founder 
 Augustine Mrema – TLP & CCM
 James Mbatia - NCCR-MAGEUZI
 Godbless Lema-CHADEMA
 Freeman Mbowe - CHADEMA
 Basil Mramba - CCM
 Adolf Mkenda - CCM
 Hassan Mtenga - CCM 
 Abubakar Asenga - CCM 
 Cyril Chami - CCM

Academics and writers

 Nathaniel Mtui, First Chaga historian and first Tanzanian published historian. 
 Leonard Shayo, Tanzanian mathematician and former presidential candidate
 Irene Tarimo, Tanzanian academic lecturer, researcher, biologist and env. scientist
 Adolf Mkenda, Tanzanina academic professor and politician CCM's MP
 Elizabeth Mrema,Tanzanian Biodiversity leader and attorney
 Andrew Tarimo, Tanzanian Irrigation Expert 
 Fausta Shakiwa Mosha, Tanzanian Scientist
 Rodrique Msechu, Tanzanian Entrepreneur
 Khalila Mbowe, Tanzanian choreographer
 Doreen Kessy, Tanzanian author and educator
 Ruth Meena, Tanzanian Academic and Gender Activist 
 Elieshi Lema, Tanzanian Writer and Publisher 
 Frannie Leautier, Tanzania civil engineer and academic
Optat Herman: a professor of economics at Rhode Island University. One of Tanzania's most renowned academician and economist

Statespeople

 Augustine Saidi, First Tanzanian Chief Justice 
 Helen Kijo-Bisimba, Tanzanian human rights activist
 John Mrosso, Tanzanian Judge
 Robert Kisanga, Tanzanian Judge

Businesspeople

 Reginald Mengi - Tanzanian business tycoon and multi millionaire. 
 Michael Shirima, Tanzanian business owner. 
 Patrick E. Ngowi, Tanzanian business owner.
 Julia Lang (fashion entrepreneur), German Tanzanian creative director and entrepreneur

Sportspeople

 Leodgar Tenga - Tanzanian Football player (Former President of Tanzania Football Federation)
 Farid Musa - Tanzanian Football player
 Bruno Tarimo - Tanzanian boxer
 Haruna Moshi - Tanzanian footballer
 Hassan Kessy - Tanzanian footballer
 Amani Kyata - Tanzanian footballer
 Magdalena Moshi - Tanzanian Olympic swimmer
 William Lyimo - Tanzanian boxer
 Wilfred Moshi - First Tanzanian to summit Mount Everest

Entertainers and artists

 Bruno Tarimo, Professional Boxing athlete 
  Master J, Tanzanian music producer 
 Bill Nass, Tanzanian musician
  Joh Makini, Tanzanian iconic rapper
 Elizabeth Michael Lulu- Tanzanian actress
 Jacqueline Wolper, Tanzanian actress
 Hoyce Temu, Tanzanian beauty pageant winner
 Rosa Ree (rapper), Tanzanian female rapper
  Amani Temba, Tanzanian musician
 Sheria Ngowi, Tanzanian fashion designer
 Maua Sama, Tanzanian musician
 Mr Nice, Tanzanian musician
 Whozu, Tanzanian musician and comedian 
 Aika Marealle, Navy Kenzo Tanzanian singer and songwriter
 Ben kinyaiya, Tanzanian actor, presenter and musician
 Scola kissanga, Tanzanian radio and Tv Presenter 
 Barnaba Classic, Tanzanian singer and songwriter
 Nikki wa pili , Tanzanian rapper and District commissioner (kisarawe district)

See also

Kilimanjaro Region
Chaga languages
Kirombo Language
Kivunjo language
Mount Kilimanjaro
Tanzania
Moshi
Battle of Kilimanjaro
Pare people
Pare Mountains
Lake Chala

References

Further reading

 
 
 
 
 

Ethnic groups in Tanzania
Indigenous peoples of East Africa
People from Kilimanjaro Region